The Silver Whistle may refer to:

The Silver Whistle, an 1890 Irish novel by Geraldine Penrose Fitzgerald
The Silver Whistle (play), a 1948 American comedy-drama by Robert E. McEnroe
"The Silver Whistle" (Playhouse 90), a 1959 American TV adaptation of McEnroe's play
"The Silver Whistle", a 1979 American short story by Jay Williams in The Practical Princess and other Liberating Fairy Tales

See also
 Silver Thistle (Carlina acaulis)